Bitter Life is a Turkish TV series that was initially broadcast by Show TV in 2005.

Plot

Mehmet and Nermin are desperately in love with each other. Both are living in the suburbs of Istanbul, trying to stay one step ahead of poverty by working harder each day. Their only aim is to get married and have a nice home. While Mehmet works as a welder in a shipyard, Nermin is a manicurist in one of the well known coiffeurs. But no matter how hard they try, they just never earn enough money to realize their dream. Ender, one of Istanbul's playboys sees Nermin and falls in love with her. Nermin, not being able to realise her dreams, gets upset, drunk and makes the biggest mistake of her life and spends the night with Ender. She has no other choice than to marry him. She leaves her old poor life and her only real love behind and starts a new life in richness with Ender. Heartbroken, Mehmet, decides to get revenge on Ender for taking his only love from him. He knows that Ender's family are rich and evil, so he decides to become rich as well, by stealing money from them, to be able to beat them in their own game. But despite all the things Mehmet goes through, he can't forget Nermin's love and pines for her. Even though he thinks Nermin betrayed him for money, he remains madly in love with her. He fights for his lost love until the end.

Cast 
 Kenan İmirzalıoğlu as Mehmet Kosovalı
 Selin Demiratar as Nermin Yıldız
 Oguz Galeli as Ender Kervancıoğlu
 Ebru Kocaağa as Filiz Kervancıoğlu
 Ahmet Yenilmez as Hasan Cin
 Ekin Türkmen as Özlem Kosovalı
 Murat Soydan as Celal Kosovalı
 Meral Orhonsay as Sultan Kosovalı
 Ferdi Merter as Sefa Kervancıoğlu
 Anta Toros as Belkıs Kervancıoğlu

References

External links 

2000s Turkish television series